SF Ammonia is a steam-powered railway ferry on Lake Tinn in Telemark, Norway. The ferry was one of the four railway ferries on Lake Tinn  that connected the Rjukan Line with the Tinnoset Line. This system was used by   Norsk Hydro to transport chemicals from Rjukan to the port in Skien. The ferry is one of four remaining steam-powered railway ferries in the world, and can still be seen docked at Mæl, Norway.

Specifics

Ammonia is capable of carrying 17 railway cars, totalling 630 tonnes, on 120 metres of track – double-track standard gauge, in addition to 150 passengers. She has two steam engines each of 300 kW (400 hp), and can achieve a speed of 12 knots (22 km/h).

History
Ammonia was the third railway ferry built for Norsk Transport; when she was ordered in 1928 the two older ferries Rjukanfos and Hydro were too small. She was in reality an alternative to extending Hydro by at least twenty meters. Diesel traction was considered, but at the time diesel was not optimal for ships. She was built by A/S Moss Værtft & Dokk at the docks on Lake Tinn and launched on 18 June 1929 and cost NOK 932,000 to build, of which Norsk Transport paid NOK 829,485.

She quickly became the main ferry; in 1939 she was in service 340 days, while Hydro operated 32 days and Rjukanfos 18. After the sinking of Hydro in 1944, Ammonia had to do the main hauling across the lake, and by September 1944 she was performing eight round trips each day. In 1951 the coal boilers were replaced with petroleum-fueled ones.

When the diesel-powered MF Storegut was launched in 1956 Ammonia was down-graded to a reserve ship, mainly serving when Storegut was for repairs. She also portrayed Hydro in the 1965 film The Heroes of Telemark. In the 1970s Norsk Transport considered rebuilding her to diesel-power She was taken out of service when the railways ceased operating in 1991, but remains docked at Mæl in operational condition.

References

Other sources

External links

 Postcard showing SF Ammonia being launched on June 18, 1929

Ships built in Moss, Norway
Ferries of Norsk Transport
1929 ships
Steamships of Norway
Cultural heritage of Norway